Hold On, We're Strummin' is an album by American musicians David Grisman and Sam Bush.
It features Grisman and Bush on a number of different instruments. They are accompanied by Sam Grisman, members of the David Grisman Quintet, and other guests.

Track listing
All compositions by David Grisman and Sam Bush, unless otherwise noted.

 Hartford's Real 6:03
 Swamp Thing 4:58
 Intimo 5:53
 Jamgrass 741 6:29
 Sea Breeze 7:50
 Old Time Medley (trad.) 3:43
 Weeping Mandolin Waltz 5:31
 Arachnid Stomp 1:35
 Crusher and Hoss 3:00
 The Old South 2:50
 Mando Space 1:32
 Ralph's Banjo Special (Stanley) 3:06
 'Cept Old Bill (Burns) 2:41
 Rhythm Twins 0:34
 Dan'l Boone (Grisman) 4:05
 Hold on, I'm Comin' (Hayes)  10:32

Personnel
 David Grisman – mandolin, mandocello, octave mandola, mandola, banjo–mandolin, banjo
 Sam Bush – mandolin, violin, octave mandola, mandocello, banjo, bass guitar, national mandolin
 Enrique Coria – guitar
 Dimitri Vandellos – guitar
 Jim Kerwin – bass
 Jack Lawrence – guitar
 Jim Nunally – guitar
 Hal Blaine – drums
 Sam Grisman – bass

References

2004 albums
David Grisman albums
Sam Bush albums
Acoustic Disc albums